The men's pentathlon was a track and field athletics event held as part of the Athletics at the 1912 Summer Olympics programme.  It was the first time the event was held. Twenty-six athletes from 11 nations competed. NOCs could enter up to 12 athletes.

Results
Thorpe's gold medal was stripped by the International Olympic Committee in 1913, after the IOC learned that Thorpe had taken expense money for playing baseball, violating contemporary Olympic amateurism rules, before the 1912 Games. This moved everyone else up in the rankings. In 1982, the IOC was convinced that the disqualification had been improper, as no protest against Thorpe's eligibility had been brought within the required 30 days and reinstated Thorpe's medals, but without demoting the other athletes. This made Thorpe and Bie co-champions. In 2022, in consultation with surviving members of Bie's family, the IOC reinstated Thorpe as the sole winner of the event, as all his competitors had always wanted.

The placings for each discipline, used to calculate the points awarded against each athlete, were recalculated discounting Thorpe in 1913. Thorpe's reinstatement in 1982 was as co-holder of his positions in each discipline, leaving the revised points against the other athletes unchanged.

Long jump

Javelin throw

200 metres

Halt and Waitzer both dropped out of the running, not finishing the 200 metres.  After the event was over, only the top 12 athletes advanced to the fourth event, with everyone else eliminated.  Scores were recalculated after the eliminations.

Discus throw

Only the top 6 athletes after the discus throw advanced to the final event.  Since at the time there was a tie for 6th (before the points were recalculated after Jim Thorpe's disqualification), both of the 6th-place athletes moved on, making 7 competitors in the 1500 metres.  Scores were not recalculated after the second cut.

1500 metres

The tie between Donahue and Lukeman was broken by calculating each athlete's score on the decathlon table, originally deciding between a bronze medal and fourth place.  Donahue won, 3475.865 points to 3396.975 points, to take the bronze medal.  Thorpe's disqualification in 1913 resulted in Bie being awarded the gold medal, while Donahue and Lukeman moved up to silver and bronze, respectively.  When Thorpe's results were reinstated 70 years later, his gold medal status was returned while the other three athletes kept their upgraded placings—resulting in two gold medalists. In 2022, the IOC declared Thorpe as the sole winner of the gold medal, and named Bie a co-winner of silver alongside Donahue.

References

Sources
 
 

Athletics at the 1912 Summer Olympics
1912